Craniophora is a genus of moths of the family Noctuidae.

Species
Craniophora draudti H.L. Han & Kononenko, 2010
 Craniophora praeclara (Graeser, 1890)
 Craniophora fasciata Moore, [1884]
 Craniophora fujianensis Kiss & Gyulai, 2013
 Craniophora harmandi (Poujade, 1898)
 Craniophora ligustri Denis & Schiffermüller, 1775 – coronet
 Craniophora melanisans Wiltshire, 1980
 Craniophora malesiae Holloway, 1989
 Craniophora nodyna Turner, 1904
 Craniophora oda (Lattin, 1949)
 Craniophora phaeocosma Turner, 1920
 Craniophora pontica Staudinger, 1879
 Craniophora sichuanensis Kiss, Gyulai & Saldaitis, 2013

References

External links
Craniophora at Markku Savela's Lepidoptera and Some Other Life Forms
 Craniophora. Natural History Museum, London.

Acronictinae